Wooroona is a rural locality in the Central Highlands Region, Queensland, Australia.

Road infrastructure
The Fitzroy Developmental Road passes to the east.

References 

Central Highlands Region
Localities in Queensland